The 2008 FIFA Beach Soccer World Cup was the fourth edition of the FIFA Beach Soccer World Cup, governed by FIFA. Overall, this was the 14th edition of a world cup in beach soccer since the establishment of the Beach Soccer World Championships which ran from 1995–2004 but was not governed by FIFA. It took place in Marseille, France, in the Plages du Prado from 17 to 27 July 2008. It was the first tournament to take place outside Brazil.

The winners of the tournament were Brazil, who won their third consecutive FIFA Beach Soccer World Cup title and their twelfth title overall.

Qualifying rounds

Africa 

The qualifiers to determine the two African nations who would play in the World Cup took place in Durban, South Africa for the third year running between March 25 and March 30. Eight nations took part in the competition, all of whom participated in the 2007 Championship, which eventually saw Senegal claim their first title, qualifying for the second successive World Cup and which saw Cameroon finish in second place, also qualifying for the second time.

Asia 

The Asian qualifiers took place in Dubai, United Arab Emirates, for the third time, between May 6 and May 10. The hosts, the United Arab Emirates qualified for the second time after beating Japan in the final of the championship, 4-3, for the second consecutive year. Iran beat China in the third place play off to claim the third berth at the World Cup for the third year in a row.

Europe 

For the first time since the FIFA Beach Soccer World Cup qualifiers began in 2006, due to the large interest of European nations in beach soccer, UEFA held a tournament dedicated to World Cup qualification in Benidorm, Spain, between, May 11 and May 18, instead of allowing European nations to qualify to the World Cup through the Euro Beach Soccer League. Hosts Spain won the championship, with neighbours Portugal finishing second. Russia beat Italy in the third place play off, but regardless of the result, both teams qualified to the World Cup, along with the finalists.

North, Central American and Caribbean Zone 

The North, Central America and the Caribbean Zone qualifiers took place between April 17 and April 19 in Puerto Vallarta, Mexico. Mexico and El Salvador were the two finalists, meaning they both qualified for the World Cup; Mexico for the second time and El Salvador for the first. Mexico defeated El Salvador in the final to win their first title.

South America 

The South American qualifiers took place between April 23 and April 27, in the Argentinean capital, Buenos Aires. Brazil and hosts Argentina were the two finalists, meaning they both qualified for the World Cup. Brazil defeated Argentina in the final to win the title. Uruguay and Venezuela were knocked out in the semi finals and played each other in the third place play off. Uruguay beat Venezuela to claim the third berth at the World Cup.

Oceania 
For the first and to date only time, no Oceanian qualifiers were held. The Oceania Football Confederation nominated the Solomon Islands as their representative in the World Cup, based on their results over the past two years, which showed that they were by far the strongest team in the confederation.

Hosts 
France qualified automatically as the hosts.

Teams 
These are the teams that qualified to the World Cup:

Asian zone:
 
 
 

African zone:
 
 

European zone:
  (hosts)
 
 
 
 

North, Central American and Caribbean zone:
  (First Appearance)
 

Oceanian zone:
 

South American zone:

Players

Venue 
A stadium on the Plage du Prado in southern Marseille was used known as the Stade du Prado or the Stadium of the Beach in English. The stadium hosted all 32 matches.

Group stage 
The 16 teams present at the finals in Brazil were split into 4 groups of 4 teams. Each team played the other 3 teams in its group in a round-robin format, with the top two teams advancing to the quarter finals. The quarter finals, semi finals and the final itself was played in the form of a knockout tournament.

All matches are listed as local time (UTC+1)

Group A 

 Note: France, Uruguay and Senegal were involved in a tie-break situation and therefore their matches against Iran were ignored and the nations were ranked by their goal difference in the matches against each other. Despite France having the worst overall goal difference, they had the best goal difference between the three teams involved in the tie-break and therefore finished in first place. Uruguay, with an equal number of goals scored and conceded, against France and Senegal finished second, and Senegal with a negative goal difference of -1, finished third.

Group B

Group C

Group D

Knockout stage

Quarter finals

Semi finals

Third place play off

Final

Winners

Awards

Top scorers 

13 goals
  Madjer
11 goals
  Amarelle
10 goals
  Belchior
8 goals
  James Naka
  Pape Koukpaki
7 goals
  Alan
  Jeremy Basquaise
6 goals
  Benjamin
  Bruno
  Ricar
5 goals
  Buru
  Paolo Palmacci
  Didier Samoun
  Egor Shaykov
  Simone Feudi
  Roberto Pasquali
  Federico Hilaire
  Andre

4 goals
  Martin
  Daniel
  Facundo Minici
  Nico
3 goals
  Gomis Mbengue
  Dmitry Shishin
  Fabian
  Torres
  Massimiliano Esposito
  Ali Naderi
  Bakhit Alabadla
  Rami Al Mesaabi
  Parrillo
2 goals
  Ilya Leonov
  Betinho
  Júnior Negrão
  Agustin Ruiz
  Christopher Flores
  Javi Alvarez
  Gibson Hosea
  Joan Etame
  Mehdi Davoudi

2 goals (cont.)
  Moslem Mesigar
  Omo
  Ricardo Villalobos
  Tomoya Uehara
  Victor Diagne
  Ibrahim Albalooshi
  Tomas Hernandez
  Alexey Makarov
  Cesar Leguizamon
  Stéphane François
  Beirao Sousa
  Bilro
  Diego Maradona Jr
  Francesco Corosiniti
  Giuseppe Condorelli
  Sidney
  Giuseppe Soria
Own goals
  Alireza Rahimi (for France )
  Gideon Omokirio (for Portugal )
  Ekwalla Eyoum (for the United Arab Emirates )
  Aime Yombi (for Russia )
  Katsuhiro Yoshii (for Brazil )
  Coco (for Portugal )
35 others scored 1 goal each

Final standings

References

External links 
 FIFA Beach Soccer World Cup Marseilles 2008 , FIFA.com
 FIFA Technical Report

 
FIFA Beach Soccer World Cup
Beach Soccer World Cup
International association football competitions hosted by France
World Cup